This is a listing of the horses that finished in either first, second, or third place and the number of starters in the Miss Preakness Stakes, a Grade 3 race for fillies age three run at six forlongs on the dirt held at Pimlico Race Course  in Baltimore, Maryland.

See also 
 Pimlico Race Course
 List of graded stakes at Pimlico Race Course

References 

Pimlico Race Course